Serbia competed at the 2016 Winter Youth Olympics in Lillehammer, Norway from 12 to 21 February 2016.

Alpine skiing

Boys

Girls

Cross-country skiing

Girls

See also
Serbia at the 2016 Summer Olympics

2016 in Serbian sport
Nations at the 2016 Winter Youth Olympics
Serbia at the Youth Olympics